The Minister for Regional Affairs and Autonomies (Italian: Ministro per Affari Regionali e le Autonomie) is one of the positions in the Italian government.

The current Minister for Regional Affairs and Autonomies is Roberto Calderoli, a member of the League, who held the office since 22 October 2022 in the cabinet of Giorgia Meloni.

List of Ministers
 Parties

Coalitions

References

Regional Affairs